Sir Christopher Wray (1601 – 6 February 1646) was an English politician who sat in the House of Commons at various times between 1614 and 1646. He supported the Parliamentary cause in the English Civil War.

Life
Wray was the son of Sir William Wray, 1st Baronet, of Glentworth of Ashby and Barlings, Lincolnshire and his second wife, Frances Drury, widow of Sir Nicholas Clifford of Bobbing, Kent, and daughter of Sir William Drury of Hawsted, Suffolk, and Elizabeth Stafford.  In 1621 he was elected Member of Parliament for Grimsby.  He was knighted on 12 November 1623. He was re-elected MP for Grimsby in 1624 and 1625. He was elected again in 1628 and sat until 1629 when King Charles decided to rule without parliament for eleven years. He successfully resisted the levy of ship money in 1636.

In April 1640, Wray was elected MP for Grimsby in the Short Parliament and was re-elected for the Long Parliament in November 1640. He was Deputy Lieutenant of Lincolnshire under the Militia Ordinance. During the First English Civil War he co-operated in the field with John Hotham. He was appointed on 15 April 1645 commissioner of the admiralty, and on 5 December was appointed a commissioner resident with the Scottish forces besieging Newark. He died on 6 February 1646.

Family
Wray married Albinia Cecil (1603–1703), daughter of Sir Edward Cecil on 3 August 1623, at St Mary's Church, Wimbledon. They had six sons and six daughters. The eldest son, William (created  a baronet in June 1660), died in October 1669, leaving, with other issue by his wife Olympia, second daughter of Sir Humfrey Tufton, 1st Baronet of The Mote, Kent, a son, Sir Christopher Wray, who on the extinction of the male line of the elder branch of the family succeeded in 1672 to the Glentworth baronetcy, and died without issue in August 1679. On the death about March 1685–6 of his only surviving brother and successor in title, Sir William Wray, the junior baronetcy became extinct.  Christopher Wray's daughter, Frances, married Henry Vane the Younger.

Notes

References

1601 births
1646 deaths
Deputy Lieutenants of Lincolnshire
Lords of the Admiralty
Younger sons of baronets
English MPs 1621–1622
English MPs 1624–1625
English MPs 1625
English MPs 1628–1629
English MPs 1640 (April)
English MPs 1640–1648
Members of the Parliament of England for Great Grimsby